Charles Hossein Zenderoudi (born March 11, 1937) is an Iranian painter, calligrapher and sculptor, known as a pioneer of Iranian modern art and as one of the earliest artists to incorporate Arabic calligraphy elements into his artwork. He is a pioneer of the Saqqa-Khaneh movement, a genre of neo-traditional modern art found in Iran that is rooted in a history of coffee-house paintings and Shia Islam visual elements. He lives in Paris and New York.

Biography 
Hossein Zenderoudi was born in Tehran, Iran on March 11, 1937. His family was deeply religious, and they often read the Quran.

Zenderoudi attended the Fine Art College of University of Tehran in the 1950s to study painting and calligraphy. He was active in the arts community in Iran, through his membership of art groups between 1958 and 1960, he became one of the founders of the Saqqakhaneh movement, which explored the use of Shia Islam visual elements and calligraphy in art. He influenced generations of artists internationally.

After winning an award at the 2nd annual Tehran Painting Biennial in 1960, he moved in 1961 to Paris, France and later became a French national.

In 2008, his painting titled Tchaar Bagh was sold at Christie's international auction in Dubai for $1.6 million. There has been controversy around this artist's legacy of work and his rights to certification of his artwork, including his family estate/foundation certifying (or denying certification) of his work retroactively.

Zenderoudi’s granddaughter is the French singer-songwriter, Barbara Pravi, who represented France at the Eurovision Song Contest 2021, finishing 2nd place.

Work

Collections 
Hossein Zenderoudi's artwork held in permanent museum collections:
K+L+32+H+4. Mon père et moi (My Father and I) (1962), mixed-media on board, The Museum of Modern Art (MoMA), New York City, New York
Miuz Skfe (1971), oil on canvas, Centre Georges Pompidou, Paris. France
The Hand (1960-1961), mixed-media collage, Grey Art Gallery at New York University (NYU), New York City, New York
Who is this Hossein the world is crazy about? (1958), linocut print on linen, British Museum, London, United Kingdom, acquired by the museum in 2011

Awards
 1958 - Prize at the Paris Biennial
 1964 – Cagnes-sur-Mer prize
 1959 – Award of the Iran-America Society, Tehran
 1961 – Laureate of the Paris Biennial, France
 1962 – Laureate of the Venice Biennale, Italy

See also 
 Iranian modern and contemporary art

References

External links 
 Official Website

Iranian painters
Iranian sculptors
People from Tehran
1937 births
Living people
20th-century sculptors
21st-century sculptors
Contemporary painters
20th-century Iranian people
21st-century Iranian people
University of Tehran alumni
20th-century Iranian painters